Georgi Kostadinov (born 16 January 1950) is a former boxer from Bulgaria. He competed at the 1972 Summer Olympics and the 1976 Summer Olympics.

Amateur career
Georgi Kostadinov won the Olympic flyweight gold medal at the 1972 Munich Olympic Games for Bulgaria. His results were:
Round of 64: bye
Round of 32: Defeated Jan Balouch (Pakistan) TKO 2
Round of 16: Defeated Chris Ius (Canada) by decision, 5–0
Quarterfinal: Defeated Calixto Perez (Colombia) by decision, 3–2
Semifinal: Defeated Leszek Błażyński (Poland) by decision, 5–0
Final: Defeated Leo Rwabwogo (Uganda) by decision, 5–0 (won gold medal)

References

External links
databaseOlympics
Interview with Georgi Kostadinov 
 

1950 births
Living people
Flyweight boxers
Boxers at the 1972 Summer Olympics
Boxers at the 1976 Summer Olympics
Olympic boxers of Bulgaria
Olympic gold medalists for Bulgaria
Sportspeople from Burgas
Olympic medalists in boxing
Bulgarian male boxers
Medalists at the 1972 Summer Olympics
20th-century Bulgarian people